The Lacassane Company is a land management company, with a goal of sustainable land management using an environmental management scheme that involves a host of tools including holistic management. Located primarily in Jefferson Davis and Cameron parish, with property in Ragley, Louisiana, the company headquarters is in Lake Charles, Louisiana.

History 
Founded in 1929, by eight Lake Charles area businessmen, with land purchased from Jim Gardiner. The company was formed with 2250 common shares of stock with share-holders including, W. P. Weber, H. G. Chalkley, C. O. Noble, Henry Pomeroy, George M. King and Frank Roberts, M. J. Muller, and purchased 21,000 acres that included farm machinery, implements, stock, and cattle bought for $380,000.00, that included what was the Lowery and Illinois plantations, that became known as "The Illinois Plant", and "The Lowery Plant".

The Lacassane company continued with the previous form of tenant farming, increasing the original cattle herd, establishing trapping, hunting, oil and gas leases, and then the wetlands mitigation project.

Current 
The Illinois Plant is called the Lacassane Coastal Prairie Mitigation Bank and the Ragley property, in conjunction with the "Calcasieu Mitigation Bank" and partnered with  Ecosystem Investment Partners (EIP), is known as the Bill Jackson Longleaf Savannah Mitigation Bank. Both have been designated (through The Lacassane Company) by the Corps of Engineers as a mitigation bank providing ecosystem services to the public in the form of Environmental mitigation (compensatory mitigation) to ensure the no net loss wetlands policy is followed to prevent Biodiversity loss that keeps the greenhouse debt in check. The Lacassane Company partnered with The Coastal Plain Conservancy to hold conservation servitudes on the land. The banks are monitored and maintained by Wildlands, Inc., an environmental consulting and plant propagation company.

The company operations now include land leases for waterfowl (Waterfowl Limited Liability Company) and other hunting, cattle grazing, alligator hide and egg harvesting, oil and gas exploration, and wetland projects. A pumping system through canals, laterals, the Bell City ditch, the Lacassine Bayou and the Mermentau River provides irrigation for the farming operations. The company's SIC code (Lessors of Real Property, NEC) is 6519 and the NAICS CODE (Lessors of Other Real Estate Property) is 531190.

Seed Propagation Project 
In 2006, The Lacassane Company became the parent company of Louisiana Native Seed Company, that provides ecospecies such as Little Bluestem, Brownseed Paspalum, Florida Paspalum, Switchgrass, Partridge Pea, and Eastern Gamagrass and has consultants with experience in Agricultural science and botany. The Louisiana Native Seed Company is listed as a provider for the United States Department of Agriculture's Natural Resources Conservation Service.

The Lacassane Club 
The Lacassane Club was founded in 2013, as a subsidiary of The Lacassane Company, on 14,000 of the 21,000 acres owned by the company. The company offers personal and corporate hunting memberships that include access to the lodge, separate sleeping quarters called casitas and a 3 bedroom, 2 bath house called Jed’s Cabin. The staff includes the club manager, a head guide, 4 other guides, an executive chef, and a Zoology/Wildlife Management biologist.

References

External links
 United States EPA Compensatory Mitigation website
 National Mitigation Banking Association
 Endangered Species and Threatened Wildlife and Plants; Recovery Crediting Guidance

Real estate companies of the United States
Agriculture companies of the United States
Soil and crop science organizations
Economy and the environment
Environmental engineering
Environmental mitigation
Real estate companies established in 1929
Renewable resource companies established in 1929
1929 establishments in Louisiana
American companies established in 1929